The first Goh Chok Tong Cabinet was formed after then-Prime Minister Goh Chok Tong was sworn in after the previous Prime Minister, Lee Kuan Yew, stepped down and handed over prime ministership to Goh on 28 November 1990.

Composition

Ministers

Ministers of State and Parliamentary Secretaries

References 

Executive branch of the government of Singapore
Lists of political office-holders in Singapore
Cabinets established in 1990